Tarnów Voivodeship was a unit of administrative division and local government in Poland in years 1975–1998, superseded by a much larger Lesser Poland Voivodeship. Its capital city was Tarnów. Located in southeastern part of the country, its area was 4,151 km2. (which was 1.3% of the total area of Poland). In 1975 the population was 577,900, in 1998 it grew to 700,800.

 Tarnów (121 494)
 Dębica (49 107)
 Bochnia (29 887)
 Brzesko (17 859)
 Dąbrowa Tarnowska (11 178)

See also
 Voivodeships of Poland

References

Former voivodeships of Poland (1975–1998)
Tarnów
History of Lesser Poland Voivodeship
History of Podkarpackie Voivodeship